Megh Malhar is a Hindustani classical raga. The name derives from the Sanskrit word Megh, meaning cloud. Legends say that this raga has the power to bring out rains in the area where it is sung. Megh Malhar is similar to raga Megh with a tint of Malhar in it.

According to Indian classical vocalist Pandit Jasraj, Megh Malhar is a seasonal raag and is sung as invitation to rains.

Theory

Arohana & Avarohana 
Arohana: S R P m P n (d) N S

Avarohana: S' n P m R g~ m R S

Vadi & Samavadi 
In this raga vadi is Sa and samavadi is Pa

Pakad
'n 'P R g~ m R S

Organization & Relationships

Related ragas: Ragas of Malhar family, namely Megh, Miyan ki Malhar, Gaud Malhar, Ramdasi Malhar, Dhuliya Malhar, etc. as well as Madhmad Sarang
Madhyamavati rāga in Carnatic music can be considered as equivalent to it.

Thaat: Kafi.

Behavior

Samay (Time) 
Late night.

Seasonality

Raga Megh Malhar is commonly associated with the monsoon season.

Historical Information

Legend

There is legend stating that Tansen's physical agony after singing Raga Deepak (Poorvi Thaat) was pacified by listening to Raga Megh Malhar rendered by two sisters, Tana and Riri.

Film Songs

Language:Tamil

References

Further reading
Conway, Neil & Briner, Rob B. Indian Culture: A Critical Understanding of Theory and Research. Oxford, UK: Oxford University Press, (2005)

External links
Film Songs in Rag Megh Malhar

Hindustani ragas
Indian music